Hydrelia elegans is a moth in the family Geometridae. It is found in Nepal.

References

Moths described in 1982
Asthenini
Moths of Asia